Schadenbeek is a small river of Lower Saxony, Germany. It flows into the Krumme Lutter north of Bad Lauterberg.

See also
List of rivers of Lower Saxony

Rivers of Lower Saxony
Rivers of Germany